Stephen Arthur Stills (born January 3, 1945) is an American musician, singer and songwriter best known for his work with Buffalo Springfield and Crosby, Stills, Nash & Young. As both a solo act and member of two successful bands, Stills has combined record sales of over 35 million albums. He was ranked number 28 in Rolling Stones 2003 list of "The 100 Greatest Guitarists of All Time" and number 47 in the 2011 list. Stills became the first person to be inducted twice with his groups on the same night into the Rock and Roll Hall of Fame. According to Neil Young, "Stephen is a genius."

Beginning his professional career with Buffalo Springfield, he composed  "For What It's Worth", which became one of the most recognizable songs of the 1960s. Other notable songs he contributed to the band were "Sit Down, I Think I Love You", "Bluebird", and "Rock & Roll Woman". According to bandmate Richie Furay, he was "the heart and soul of Buffalo Springfield".

After Buffalo Springfield disbanded, Stills began working with David Crosby and Graham Nash as a trio called Crosby, Stills & Nash (CSN). In addition to writing many of the band's songs, Stills played bass, guitar, and keyboards on their debut album. The album sold over four million copies and at that point had outsold anything from the three members' prior bands: the Byrds, Buffalo Springfield, and the Hollies. The album won the trio a Grammy Award for Best New Artist.

Stills's first solo album, Stephen Stills, earned a gold record and is the only album to feature both Jimi Hendrix and Eric Clapton. Its hit single "Love the One You're With" became his biggest solo hit, peaking at number 14 on the Billboard Hot 100. Stills followed this with a string of solo albums, as well as starting a band with Chris Hillman called Manassas in 1972. In the summer 1974, Young reunited with CSN after a four-year hiatus for a concert tour that was recorded and released in 2014 as CSNY 1974. It was one of the first stadium tours and the largest tour the band has done to date. CSN reunited in 1977 for their album CSN, which became the trio's best-selling record. CSN and CSNY continued to have platinum albums through the 1980s.

Early years
Stills was born in Dallas, the son of William Arthur Stills (1915–1986) and Talitha Quintilla Collard (1919–1996). Raised in a military family, he moved around as a child and developed an interest in blues and folk music. He was also influenced by Latin music after spending his youth in Gainesville and Tampa, Florida, as well as Covington, Louisiana, Costa Rica, the Panama Canal Zone, and El Salvador. Stills attended Admiral Farragut Academy in St. Petersburg, Florida and Saint Leo College Preparatory School in Saint Leo, Florida, before graduating from Lincoln High School in Costa Rica.

When he was nine years old, he was diagnosed with a partial hearing loss in one ear. The hearing loss increased as he got older.

Stills dropped out of Louisiana State University in the early 1960s. He played in a series of bands, including the Continentals, which then featured future Eagles guitarist Don Felder. Stills also sang as a solo artist at Gerde's Folk City, a well-known coffeehouse in Greenwich Village. Stills eventually ended up in a nine-member vocal harmony group, the house act at the famous Cafe au Go Go in New York City, called the Au Go Go Singers, which included his future Buffalo Springfield bandmate Richie Furay. This group did some touring in the Catskills and in the South, released one album in 1964, and then broke up in 1965. Afterwards, Stills formed a folk-rock group called The Company with four other former members of the Au Go Go Singers. The Company embarked on a six-week tour of Canada, where Stills met guitarist Neil Young. On the VH1 CSNY Legends special, Stills said that Young was doing what he always wanted to do, "play folk music in a rock band." The Company broke up in New York within four months; Stills did session work and went to various auditions. In 1966 he convinced a reluctant Furay, then living in Massachusetts, to move with him to California.

Life and career

Buffalo Springfield and Super Session (1966–1968) 

Stills, Furay, and Young reunited in Los Angeles and formed the core of Buffalo Springfield. Legend has it that Stills and Furay recognized Young's converted hearse and flagged him down, a meeting described in a recent solo track "Round the Bend". Buffalo Springfield performed a mixture of folk, country, psychedelia, and rock. Its sound was lent a hard edge by the twin lead guitars of Stills and Young, and that combination helped make Buffalo Springfield a critical success. The band's first record Buffalo Springfield (1966) sold well after Stills's topical song "For What It's Worth" became a top ten hit, reaching No. 7 on the US charts. According to Rolling Stone, the Rock and Roll Hall of Fame and other sources, Buffalo Springfield helped create the genres of folk rock and country rock. Distrust of their management along with the arrest and deportation of bassist Bruce Palmer worsened the already strained relations among the group members and led to Buffalo Springfield's demise. A second album, Buffalo Springfield Again, was released in late 1967 and featured Stills songs "Bluebird" and "Rock And Roll Woman". In May 1968, the band split up for good, but contractual obligations required the recording and release of a final studio album, Last Time Around. The album was primarily composed of tracks recorded earlier that year. A Stills song from their debut album, "Sit Down, I Think I Love You," was a minor hit for The Mojo Men in 1967.

After the disintegration of Buffalo Springfield, Stills played on half of the Super Session album with Al Kooper in 1968, including a cover of Donovan's "Season of the Witch" that received heavy radio play on progressive FM radio formats. Mike Bloomfield was slated to play on the album but failed to turn up for the second day of recording. The album sold well and charted at No. 12 on the US charts while being certified Gold in December 1970.

Crosby, Stills, Nash & Young (1969–1970) 
In late 1968, Stills joined forces with David Crosby (late of The Byrds) and Graham Nash (late of The Hollies) to form Crosby, Stills & Nash. Several of Stills's songs on the group's debut album, including "Suite: Judy Blue Eyes" and "You Don't Have to Cry", were inspired by his on-again off-again relationship with singer Judy Collins. The album reached No. 6 on the US charts and was certified quadruple platinum.

Stills dominated the recording of the album. Crosby and Nash played guitar on their own songs respectively, while drummer Dallas Taylor played on four tracks and drummer Jim Gordon on a fifth. Stills played all the bass, organ, and lead guitar parts, as well as acoustic guitar on his own songs. "The other guys won't be offended when I say that one was my baby, and I kind of had the tracks in my head," Stills said.

Wanting to tour and needing additional musicians to fill out their sound, the band invited former Buffalo Springfield member Neil Young to join them for their first tour and second album to make the group the quartet Crosby, Stills, Nash & Young (initialized as CSN&Y). The first tour started in August 1969 and finished in January 1970, followed by the recording their debut album as a quartet, Déjà Vu (1970). The foursome quarrelled frequently throughout the recording sessions, in particular Stills and Young, who both fought for control. Stills composed the songs "Carry On" and "4 + 20" and co-wrote "Everybody I Love You" with Young. He also brought his version of Joni Mitchell's song "Woodstock" for the band to cover. The album reached No. 1 on the US charts and was certified 7 times platinum there, selling over 8 million copies. In May 1970, CSN&Y recorded Young's  "Ohio" following the Kent State massacre on May 4. The single's B-side was Stills's "Find the Cost Of Freedom". The single was rush released  by Atlantic Records at the same subsequent time as the group's "Teach Your Children" was climbing the charts. After an extended second tour finishing in July 1970, the band split up acrimoniously. Stills moved to England and started recording his debut solo album.

In April 1971, CSN&Y released 4 Way Street, a double live album recorded in 1970. The album reached No. 1 in 1971 on the US charts and was certified quadruple platinum in the US.

Having played at the Monterey Pop Festival with Buffalo Springfield and both Woodstock and Altamont with CSNY, Stills (along with Crosby) performed at three of the most iconic U.S. rock festivals of the 1960s. During CSN&Y's set at Altamont Free Concert, Stills was reported to be repeatedly stabbed in the leg by a "stoned-out" Hells Angel, with a sharpened bicycle spoke. At the band's request, their performance was not included in the subsequent film Gimme Shelter (1970).

Peak solo years (1970–71) 
In the wake of CSNY's success, all four members recorded high-profile solo albums. In 1970, Stills released his eponymous solo debut album featuring guests Eric Clapton, Jimi Hendrix, Cass Elliot, Booker T. Jones and Ringo Starr (credited only as "Richie") as well as Crosby, Nash, Rita Coolidge and CSN&Y drummers Dallas Taylor and Johnny Barbata. It provided Stills with the US No. 14 hit single "Love the One You're With.", and another US top 40 hit "Sit Yourself Down", peaking at No. 37. The album peaked at No. 3 on the US charts, a solo career peak. At the time of release, Stills's album was the highest selling solo album out of the four. It was recorded in the UK, where Stills bought a mansion in Surrey, England, previously owned by Starr. To promote the album, Stills appeared on the BBC television show Disco 2 in January 1971.

Stills followed this album with Stephen Stills 2 six months later. Recorded in Miami, the album included the singles "Change Partners" and "Marianne", which Nos. 43 and 42 in the US. The album itself reached No. 8 on the charts and was certified US Gold a month after release. Even though "Change Partners" was written before CSN formed, Nash saw it as a metaphor for the many relationships in CSN&Y. Stills initially recorded 23 songs and hoped to release them as a double album; this was ultimately rejected by Atlantic. Stills embarked on his first solo US tour with an eight-piece band including the Memphis Horns, in which he sold out Madison Square Garden (MSG), The Philadelphia Spectrum, LA Forum and the Boston Garden, arguably at his solo commercial peak. Stills's performance at MSG occurred one day prior to George Harrison's Concert For Bangladesh. Stills donated his stage, sound, lighting system and production manager in kind, but was later upset when Harrison "neglected to invite him to perform, mention his name, or say thank you". Stills then spent the show drunk in Ringo Starr's dressing room, "barking at everyone". Stills's MSG show was professionally recorded and remains unreleased, sans a clip of "Go Back Home" performed in early 1972 on the Old Grey Whistle Test. Two additional acoustic tracks were released on Stills 2013 box set Carry On.

In 1971, Billboard magazine ranked him at No. 34 top singles artist, No. 44 top album artist, No. 14 top singles male vocalist, No. 12 top new singles vocalist, No. 17 top album male vocalists, No. 14 top new album artist, number 73 top producers, and ranked his debut album number 70 in the year end album charts. Additionally, Cashbox ranked Stephen Stills 2 as the No. 51 album of 1971, and his debut as No. 52.

Manassas (1971–1973) 
In late 1971, Stills teamed up with ex-Byrd Chris Hillman to form the band Manassas. Their self-titled double album was a mixture of rock, country, blues, bluegrass and Latin music divided into different sections and peaked at number 4 in the US. It was certified US Gold a month after release but did not yield any more top 40 hits, only "It Doesn't Matter" reached 61 on the US charts. Stills spent the majority of 1972 playing live with Manassas on a world tour, which included headlining festivals in Australia, playing more arenas in the US including the Nassau Coliseum, and the Boston Garden. His concert at The Rainbow Theatre, London was recorded for BBC TV Special titled Stephen Stills Manassas: In Concert. He moved to Boulder, Colorado after this world tour finished and in March 1973 married French singer-songwriter Veronique Sanson in London England, after having met while at a Manassas gig in France, 1972. In early 1972, Stills appeared in a UK documentary about himself called Sounding Out. Cashbox magazine ranked Stills as the number 52 top male vocalist of 1972. Billboard ranked Manassas as the number 53 album of 1972, and Stills as the number 75 album artist.

All of Stills's albums after Buffalo Springfield had gone either gold or platinum; the Manassas follow-up album the next year Down the Road was his first LP that did not, but still managed to reach 26 in the US charts. It was recorded less than a year after the debut double album, and encountered some issues with recording and not having enough Stills songs on the album. Also Atlantic were pushing for a far more commercially viable CSNY reunion. Which in June and July 1973, between the two 1973 Manassas tours at the start and end of the year, happened in Maui. As CSNY attempted to record an album tentatively called Human Highway. This album was never finished due to infighting. But after one final 1973 Manassas tour, during which CSN and CSNY reunited during the acoustic sections both at Winterland Arena concerts, a reunion was in the cards, and Manassas was over. Stills then sold his Surrey home and relocated to Colorado. The last date of the first 1973 Manassas tour was recorded for ABC In Concert. Cashbox magazine ranked Manassas as the number 58 group of 1973. Billboard ranked Down The Road as the number 36 of new album artists.

In 1972/73, Stephen left the services of David Geffen and set up his own publishing company with Ken Weiss, called Gold Hill Publishing, named after his home in Boulder, Colorado.

Solo and CSNY tours (1974) 

Stills spent early 1974 on a sold out East coast tour where he played well respected theatres, including Carnegie Hall. The 1975 live album Stephen Stills Live was made up of recordings from this tour. It was also during this tour that Stills announced the 1974 CSNY reunion concert tour.  The CSNY reunion tour sold out shows through July and August in both the US and the UK, with an average concert attendance of 80,000. Due to poor management, the tour made little money for the group, but album sales saw a boost: the CSNY compilation album So Far reached number 1 in the US and sold 6 million copies. After another aborted attempt at recording another CSNY album after the tour, Stills signed with Columbia Records in late 1974. In 1973–1974, Stills was recording another solo album called As I Come Of Age, which was put aside for the CSNY reunion tour. Many songs were used for the 1975 Stills album. In 1974, Stills played bass, and help mix his wife, Veronique Sanson's, record Le Maudit. He also played bass for her at two of her concerts in Paris in October 1974. On 29 October, Stills played two short acoustic shows at Chances Are, a nightclub in Ann Arbor, Michigan, as a benefit for Democrat John Reuther's campaign. The next night, 30 October, Stills played two shows for Democratic congressional candidate Bob Carr at the Stables, East Lansing, Michigan, then another unannounced acoustic slot at a Michigan University frat party.

Signing to Columbia Records and The Stills Young Band (1975–1976) 
Stills signed to Columbia Records for three albums: Stills in 1975, Illegal Stills in 1976; and Thoroughfare Gap in 1978.  Stills released in June 1975, was the highest-charting release of the three at number 22 on the US charts, and also the most critically successful of the three. Stills then spent the rest of year touring the US, doing a summer and winter tour playing to 10,000 seat arenas, including the LA Forum, and Red Rocks Amphitheatre. Stills played an acoustic set at the Bob Dylan-organised Night of the Hurricane Benefit at the Houston Astrodome in January 1976. He next released Illegal Stills in May 1976, which reached number 31 on the US charts, but was not critically well received, nor produced any charting singles. Around this time Stills played percussion on the Bee Gees' song "You Should Be Dancing" and wrote an unreleased song with Barry Gibb. In retrospect Stills has commented on his mid-70s solo period saying he "short-circuited for a while, things were moving too fast. I got a little crazed. Too much drinking, too many drugs. What can I say." Cashbox magazine ranked Stills as the number 29 top male vocalist of 1975.

In 1976 after the release of Illegal Stills, Stills attempted a reunion with Neil Young. At one point, Long May You Run was slated to be a CSNY record, but when Crosby and Nash left to fulfill recording and touring obligations, they returned to find the other pair had wiped their vocals from the recordings, as Stills and Young decided to go on without them as the Stills-Young Band. However, Young would leave midway through the resulting tour due to an apparent throat infection. Stills was contractually bound to finish the tour, which he did for three dates before it was cancelled with Chris Hillman helping him, but upon returning home, his wife, French singer-songwriter Véronique Sanson, announced she wanted a divorce and wished to move back to France, although they temporarily reunited.

Stills went out on tour, in November 1976, as a three piece, Stills on guitar, vocals, piano, George Perry on Bass, and Joe Vitale on drums. It was around this time Stills reunited with Crosby and Nash shortly afterwards, thanks to the efforts of Nash's future wife Susan, who got Nash to forgive Stills for wiping the Crosby and Nash vocals from Long May You Run. Not before Atlantic records released a compilation album from Stills first two solo albums, and the two Manassas albums in December 1976 called Still Stills: The Best Of Stephen Stills. Cashbox magazine ranked Stills at number 27 for the top male vocalist of 1976, and Stills and Young as the number 6 duo, number 3 new duo, and number 20 best new artist of 1976. Stills, as Gold Hill publishing was having hits publishing for the band Firefall and Joey Stec, during this time, so much so that Billboard ranked him as the number 97 publisher of 1976.

CSN reunion and solo years (1977–1979) 

Stills's performances with Crosby and Nash in late 1976 and early 1977 led to the permanent reunion of Crosby, Stills, and Nash. They released the CSN album in 1977 and unsuccessfully attempted another album in 1978. The band toured major arenas including Madison Square Garden and the LA Forum in 1977 and 1978, and during the 1977 tour they visited President Jimmy Carter in the White House. Stills released his final album on Columbia Records entitled Thoroughfare Gap in October 1978. It was comparatively unsuccessful and reached number 84 on the US charts. In 1977 and 1978, Stills played only one solo engagement, at the Bread and Roses Festival in 1978.

After a four-day residency at the Roxy in January 1979 with original CSN bandmate Dallas Taylor on drums, Stills spent most of 1979 on tour in the US playing with his California Blues Band. One of these dates in early 1979 included a trip to Cuba to participate in the Havana Jam festival that took place between March 2 and 4, alongside Weather Report, the Trio of Doom, Fania All-Stars, Billy Swan, Bonnie Bramlett, Mike Finnigan, Kris Kristofferson, Rita Coolidge and Billy Joel, as well as an array of Cuban artists such as Irakere, with whom he toured the US after the Havana concerts. His performance is captured on Ernesto Juan Castellanos's documentary Havana Jam '79.

In 1979, Stills recorded one of the first entirely digital albums; however, it remains unreleased, as the record company did not feel it was commercial enough. The songs recorded for this album include "Spanish Suite" and "Cuba al Fin" and the 1982 CSN hit "Southern Cross". The album was produced by Barry Beckett and was slated for release in 1979 or 1980.

CSN played only two dates in 1979, both at Madison Square Garden for Musicians United for Safe Energy. Their performance was released on The Muse Concerts for a Non-Nuclear Future.

In 1979, Stills's wife, Veronique Sanson, filed for divorce, which was finalized on July 12, 1980.

1980s 

After playing some European dates in 1980, and with Graham Nash joining him for the German dates supporting Angelo Branduardi, Stills and Nash decided to record a duo album together. The record company refused to release this album without David Crosby, so they added him and CSN's Daylight Again was released in 1982, reaching number 8 in the US and was certified Platinum. The album featured the Stills-written top twenty hit "Southern Cross". In 1983, the CSN live album Allies, was released featuring Stills's number 45 hit song "War Games". CSN toured yearly from 1982 to 1989, except during 1986, due to David Crosby's prison sentence.

In 1984, Stills released his first solo album in 6 years, Right by You on Atlantic Records. This would be the final Stills album to make the Billboard 200 album chart and featured Jimmy Page on guitar. It was his last solo release on a major label.

In 1985 CSN and CSNY played Live Aid.

In 1988, CSNY reunited for the album American Dream, which reached number 12 on the US charts and was certified platinum in the US. However no tour was taken in support of the album.

In 1988, he married Thai model Pamela Anne Jordan, with whom he had a daughter, Eleanor.

1990s 
In 1990, CSN released the album Live It Up, their first not to be certified in the US since their debut.

Stills toured with CSN, in 1990, 1994, 1996, 1997 and 1999.

Having spent most of 1990 playing acoustic with CSN and solo he released the solo album Stills Alone in 1991, with the aim of releasing a solo electric album in 1992. However this solo electric album was never released.

In 1994, CSN released the album After The Storm.

From 1993 to 1995 part owned a restaurant in New Orleans, called Toucan Du. He married his third wife, Kristen Hathaway, on May 27, 1996.

In 1997, Stills became the first person to be inducted into the Rock and Roll Hall of Fame twice on the same night for his work with CSN and Buffalo Springfield. Fender Guitars Custom Shop crafted a guitar and presented it to Stills to commemorate the occasion, a Telecaster 1953 reissue guitar serial R2674 bearing an inscription on the neck plate; "Stephen Stills R & R Hall of Fame May 6, 1997 "

In 1999, CSNY reunited to release the album Looking Forward; it reached number 26 on the US charts.

2000s 
This CSNY reunion resulted in CSNY reunion tours 2000 CSNY2K, 2002 and 2006 reunion tours, their first since 1974. The CSNY2K tour of the United States and Canada with the reformed super quartet earned US$42.1 million, making it the eighth largest grossing tour of 2000. The 2006 CSNY tour was the Freedom Of Speech tour, which was released on the album Deja Vu Live.. Stills also toured with CSN in 2003, 2005, 2007, 2008 and 2009. The 2005 tour supported their Gold certified album Greatest Hits, their 2009 tour supported the CSN demos album Demos.

2005 saw Stills release Man Alive!, his first solo offering in 14 years. Man Alive! was released on the small English independent folk rock label Talking Elephant, and was not widely reviewed. The record did not chart on either side of the Atlantic, and was received lukewarmly by the few critics who did review it. It featured songs dating from the 70s to the present, including "Spanish Suite", originally recorded in the late 70s with Herbie Hancock.

Throughout 2006 and 2007, Stills toured regularly as a solo artist with "the Quartet", which consisted of drummer Joe Vitale, either Mike Finnigan or session player Todd Caldwell on keyboards, and either Kevin McCormick or Kenny Passarelli on bass. On May 28, 2007, Stills sang the national anthem for Game 1 of the 2007 Stanley Cup Finals between the Anaheim Ducks and Ottawa Senators in Anaheim, California. On December 17, 2007, Graham Nash revealed on Larry King Live that Stills had been diagnosed with early stage prostate cancer and that his operation would take place on January 3, 2008, which is Stills's birthday. Stills said later in January 2008 that he had come through the operation with "flying colors."

In 2007 he released Just Roll Tape, a recently found tape of Stills singing demos of his unreleased songs in 1968 after the breakup of the Buffalo Springfield, during the last hour of a Judy Collins session.

Stills toured Europe as a solo artist for the first time during October 2008, resulted in the release of the 2009 live album and video Live At Shepherds Bush, recorded in London, England.

Also in 2009, he released his second archival release Pieces by Manassas, a selection of alternate takes and unreleased songs of Stills band recorded between 1971 and 1973. This was supposed to be the start in a series of archival releases, however none have appeared since.

Later years 
Stills toured with CSN in 2010, 2012, 2014, 2015. The 2012 tour resulted in the release CSN 2012.

In 2011, Stills contributed a song, "Low Barefoot Tolerance," to the soundtrack of a documentary produced by J. Ralph, Wretches & Jabberers.

Also in 2010, Stills reunited with Neil Young and Richie Furay to reform Buffalo Springfield with Young for the Bridge School Benefit 2010. This was supposed to be followed by a full tour in 2012 but this never materialized.

On August 27, 2013, Stills released the album, Can't Get Enough with Kenny Wayne Shepherd and Barry Goldberg as the blues band the Rides. The band toured to support this release in 2013. They released a follow up album called Pierced Arrow in 2016, this was followed by another tour to support this release in 2016 -2017.

On August 12, 2014, Watsky released the album All You Can Do, featuring a song with Stills, "Cannonball".

In 2016, CSN split up after over 30 years together, and in December 2016 Stills independently released a song called "Look Each Other in the Eye" on SoundCloud.

On September 22, 2017, Stills and Judy Collins released an album Everybody Knows, which entered the Billboard 200 chart at number 195 and peaked at 45. It was their first joint album and was followed by a 2017-2018 tour supporting the album.

In April 2021, Stills gave an interview indicating that he was retired. Since the pandemic, Stills returned to guest with Brandi Carlisle at a tribute concert honoring Joni Mitchell, his first public performance since a benefit in December 2018. In February 2023, Stills announced his co-headlining appearance with Neil Young at a Light Up the Blues event, due to take place in April.

Personal life

Stills was involved with musician Judy Collins from 1968 to 1969 and wrote the song "Suite: Judy Blue Eyes" for her. He dated actress and singer-songwriter Nancy Priddy, who was the inspiration for the Buffalo Springfield song "Pretty Girl Why". Stills also had a short-term relationship with Rita Coolidge, as had Graham Nash, which apparently led to the initial breakup of CSNY, in 1970. During a Manassas tour in France, Stills met his first wife, French singer-songwriter Véronique Sanson. They were married on March 14, 1973. Their son Christopher was born in 1974. They divorced in 1979. In 1976, Stills told Rolling Stone, "My hearing has gotten to be a terrible problem. If I keep playing and touring the way I have been, I'll go deaf." In 1988, he married American model Pamela Ann Jordan, with whom he had a daughter, Eleanor. His third wife is Kristen Hathaway, whom he married on May 27, 1996.

Stills's son, Justin Stills, was born in 1972 to Harriet Tunis. Justin was critically injured while snowboarding on Mt. Charleston, just outside Las Vegas, in 1997. An episode of Discovery Health's documentary series Trauma: Life in the ER featured his treatment and recovery. Another son, Henry, has been diagnosed with Asperger syndrome and is profiled in the 2007 documentary Autism: The Musical. Stills's daughter Eleanor is a photographer and graduate of Art Center College of Design in Pasadena. Since Eleanor's graduation, she has been responsible for all recent Crosby, Stills & Nash photography. Stills has another daughter, Alex, who attends Emerson College in Boston and currently plays in the rock band Stilljill. His son Chris and daughter Jennifer are both recording artists. His youngest son, Oliver Ragland, was born in 2004 and named in honor of Neil Young, whose maternal family name is Ragland.

Stills has long been involved in liberal causes and politics. In 2000, he served as a member of the Democratic Party credentials committee from Florida during the Democratic National Convention, and was a delegate in previous years.

In December 2018, Stills received an Honorary Doctorate in Music from the University of Florida, Gainesville, where he was a speaker at the commencement ceremony.

Stills performed with Billy Porter during the 2020 Democratic National Convention.

Style, musicianship, and sound
Stills is a guitarist whose music draws from myriad genres that include rock and roll, blues, gospel, country and folk music. In addition, Latin music has played a key role in both his approach to percussion and guitar and he is also a multi-instrumentalist, capable of playing keyboards, bass, percussion, congas, clavinet, electric piano, piano, organ, banjo and drums.

Stills experimented with the guitar itself, including soaking strings in barbecue sauce or flipping pickups to mimic Hendrix playing a right-handed guitar left-handed. He is also known for using alternate guitar tunings, particularly when performing acoustically. Often a long acoustic solo section of the show would showcase agile fingerstyle playing in standard and altered tunings.  His primary alternate tuning is usually D A D F♯ A D, or "Palmer modal tuning which is 'E E E E B E' ", which can be heard in "Suite: Judy Blue Eyes," "Carry On," and "4 + 20."

For the CSN debut album in 1969, Graham Nash commented that "Stephen had a vision, and David and I let him run with it." Stills played every instrumental part on Crosby, Stills and Nash with the exception of some guitar by Crosby and Nash, and drums by Dallas Taylor.

Discography
See also discographies for The Au Go Go Singers, Buffalo Springfield, Crosby Stills Nash & Young.

Albums

Singles

Other appearances

Guest appearances

Filmography and TV appearances

Tours 

 Memphis Horns Tour 1971
 Manassas World Tour 1972
 Manassas North American Tour 1973
 1974 Theater Tour
 1975 Tour
 The Stills-Young Band Tour
 1976 Tour
 1979 California Blues Band Tour

References

External links

 Official Site
 CSN Official Site
 CSNY Official Site
 Five audio interview clips with Stephen Stills
 The Rides
 

 
American male singers
American folk rock musicians
American folk guitarists
American folk singers
American country guitarists
American blues guitarists
American country rock singers
American rock keyboardists
American rock drummers
American rock percussionists
American multi-instrumentalists
American rock pianists
American male pianists
American organists
American male organists
American rock guitarists
American male guitarists
1945 births
Living people
Lead guitarists
Buffalo Springfield members
Crosby, Stills, Nash & Young members
Atlantic Records artists
Columbia Records artists
Reprise Records artists
Musicians from Dallas
Singer-songwriters from Texas
Musicians from Tampa, Florida
Musicians from Los Angeles County, California
Zonians
Admiral Farragut Academy alumni
Gainesville High School (Florida) alumni
Henry B. Plant High School alumni
Saint Leo College Preparatory School alumni
Singer-songwriters from Florida
University of Florida alumni
People from Topanga, California
Guitarists from California
Guitarists from Florida
Guitarists from Texas
20th-century American drummers
American male drummers
20th-century American guitarists
20th-century American pianists
21st-century American keyboardists
21st-century organists
The Rides members
Singer-songwriters from California